Şurakənd, Gadabay may refer to:
Günəşli, Gadabay, Azerbaijan
Şahdağ, Azerbaijan